League tables are rankings of companies according to sets of criteria like revenue, earnings, deals, etc. The rankings can be used for investment research or promotionally.

References

Financial markets
Mergers and acquisitions